The bigeye skate (Okamejei meerdervoortii) is a type of ray in the family Rajidae. The species is commonly found in the Western Pacific.

Description  
Bigeye skate grow to a maximum recorded length of 37.0 cm. They are found at depths of 70 – 90 meters.

References 

Fish of East Asia
Rajidae
Fish described in 1860